The Antenne (French: l’Antenne) is a 49.0 km long river in the Charente-Maritime département, in southwestern France. Its source is in the commune of Fontaine-Chalendray. It flows into the Charente near Cognac.

References

Rivers of France
Rivers of Charente-Maritime
Rivers of Nouvelle-Aquitaine